Ashley Script is a typeface developed by the British designer Ashley Havinden in 1955 for Monotype Corporation. He also created the fonts Ashley Crawford and Ashley Inline.

Ashley Script is a brush script and is based on Havinden's own handwriting.

References

Monotype typefaces
Casual script typefaces
Typefaces and fonts introduced in 1955